Winged Samurai is a 1980 video game designed by David Wesely and published by Discovery Games for the Apple II, Commodore PET, TRS-80, and Atari 8-bit family. The player commands 16 Japanese fighters and must destroy incoming bombers before they can reach Rabaul.

Reception
Forrest Johnson reviewed Winged Samurai in The Space Gamer No. 33. Johnson commented that "Unfortunately, in creating this historical authenticity, the programmer sacrificed the game to the simulation. The display is purely two-dimensional, and the graphics are unimpressive. ... The game is not real time. You can take all day to make your combat decisions. ... Recommended to historical aviation gamers."

Reviews
Moves #56, p26

References

External links
Review in 80 Micro

1980 video games
Apple II games
Atari 8-bit family games
Commodore PET games
TRS-80 games
Video games developed in the United States